The Women's skeet event will take place at 25 July 2014 at the Barry Buddon Shooting Centre. There will be  a qualification to determine the final participants.

Results

Qualification

Semifinals

QB: Qualified to Bronze

QG: Qualified to Gold

Bronze

Gold

References

External links
Schedule

Shooting at the 2014 Commonwealth Games
Common